Kammy may refer to:

 nickname of Chris Kamara (born 1957), English former footballer and manager
 stage name of Kamryn Belle, 21st century Dutch singer
 Kammy Koopa, a character in the Mario franchise
 Kammy, a character in the Ojarumaru anime series